The Khudiadadzai or  Khoidadzai are a Pashtun tribe in Afghanistan and Pakistan. Most Khoidadzai are located in the Killa Saifullah District of Balochistan Province.

The Merdadzai tribe are related to the Khoidadzai but now most of them lives in Lorlai district.  Sub tribes of the Khoidadzai include Adniaazai, Bigzai, Janbigzai, Shailzai, Haleemzai, Marsenzai and Mirabzai.

Most of the khoidadzai tribe lives in qilla saifullah district.

Khoidadzai tribe has a conflict with Meerzai tribe where they lost almost 80 personals. the graveyard of those martyrs are still existing near NA50's right side when you are on the way to killa saifullah from Muslim bagh. Hakim Khoidadzai( father of shahzeb khoidadzai) played a vital role to capture the hills for Khoidadzai tribe from Meerzai tribe. MNA  Abdul wasay is from khoidadzai tribe and is praised by locals for development of the tribal areas. Nisai muslimbagh is the stronghold of the tribe. Khoidadzai tribe is known for their resistance to foreign forces and protection of their Lands.

The khoidad zai tribe led by saifullah khoidadzai fought against Britishers in their zhob expedition.

The notable and historical personalities of khoidad zai were. 
Saif ullah Khan khoidad zai. Basharat khan khoidadzai ( son in law of shah jahan jogezai), shahzeb khoidadzai, (late) haji qudoos khoidadzai( uncle of shahzeb khoidadzai),( late) malak Hakeem khoidadzai ( father of shahzeb khoidadzai), haji mahteen khoidadzai (uncle of shahzeb khoidadzai), 
Malik Haji Abdul Wahab khoidad zai Baig zai of Nisai. 
Haji Malik Abdul Karim khoidad zai (grandfather of shahzeb khoidadzai), Baig zai of Muslim Bagh. 
Haji Malik Abdul Haq Khoidad zai, Adnia zai of Shina khora.

Haji Malik Muhammad Azam Merhab zai.
Mulana Abdul Wasay x- Senior minister of Balochistan.
And Present MNA of National Assembly of Pakistan.

References

Gharghashti Pashtun tribes
Pashto-language surnames
Pakistani names